Brodric Thomas (born January 28, 1997) is an American professional basketball player who last played for the Boston Celtics of the National Basketball Association (NBA). He played college basketball for the Truman State Bulldogs.

High school and college career
Thomas attended Bolingbrook High School in Illinois where he played basketball. At Bolingbrook, he "played second or third fiddle" to teammates who went on to play for NCAA Division I schools. As a result, he received comparatively less attention from college basketball recruiters.

Thomas committed to play college basketball in NCAA Division II for the Truman State Bulldogs. Before his freshman year, he suffered an injury which forced him to redshirt. In the meantime, his grades suffered and he transferred to Southwestern Community College where he grew four inches, added fifty pounds, won a NJCAA Men's Division II Basketball Championship, was named the MVP of that tournament, was First Team All-Iowa Community College Athletic Conference, was named Second-Team All-American and attracted the attention of NCAA Division I recruiters.

However, he ultimately decided to return to Truman. He played three seasons for the Bulldogs. As a senior, he was named the Great Lakes Valley Conference Player of the Year and scored a school record 666 points.

Professional career

Houston Rockets (2020–2021)
After going undrafted in the 2020 NBA draft, Thomas signed with the Houston Rockets. His contract was converted to a two-way contract at the end of training camp.

He made his NBA debut on December 26, 2020 in Portland at the Moda Center. On February 12, 2021, Thomas was waived by the Rockets. He had totaled ten points in 24 minutes over four games with the Rockets.

Rio Grande Valley Vipers (2021) 
On February 14, 2021, the Rio Grande Valley Vipers announced that they had signed Thomas.

Cleveland Cavaliers (2021) 
On February 24, 2021, Thomas was signed by Cleveland Cavaliers to a two-way contract. He was re-signed on September 15, but was later waived on October 12.

Boston Celtics (2021–2022) 
On October 18, 2021, Thomas signed a two-way deal with the Boston Celtics. The Celtics reached the 2022 NBA Finals, where they were defeated by the Golden State Warriors in 6 games. He re-signed with the Celtics on September 23, 2022. He was waived on October 12, 2022.

Personal life
Thomas majored in psychology in his college time.

Career statistics

NBA

Regular season

|-
| style="text-align:left;"| 
| style="text-align:left;"| Houston
| 4 || 0 || 6.0 || .286 || .167 || .714 || 1.0 || 1.0 || .3 || .3 || 2.5
|-
| style="text-align:left;"| 
| style="text-align:left;"| Cleveland
| 28 || 1 || 13.4 || .366 || .283 || .667 || 1.8 || 1.9 || .5 || .3 || 4.1
|-
| style="text-align:left;"| 
| style="text-align:left;"| Boston
| 12 || 0 || 5.0 || .444 || .222 || .600 || .8 || .9 || .1 || .1 || 1.8
|- class="sortbottom"
| style="text-align:center;" colspan="2"|Career
| 44 || 1 || 10.4 || .373 || .265 || .667 || 1.4 || .9 || .4 || .3 || 3.3

References

External links
Truman Bulldogs bio

1997 births
Living people
American men's basketball players
Basketball players from Illinois
Boston Celtics players
Canton Charge players
Cleveland Cavaliers players
Houston Rockets players
Maine Celtics players
People from Bolingbrook, Illinois
Rio Grande Valley Vipers players
Shooting guards
Truman Bulldogs men's basketball players
Undrafted National Basketball Association players